Abdullah Doğan (born 10 February 1997) is a footballer who plays as a right winger or attacking midfielder for Bremen-Liga club Vatan Sport Bremen. Born in Germany, he represented Turkey internationally at youth levels U17 and U18.

Career
After playing for SGO Bremen and TuS Komet Arsten, Doğan moved to the youth team of Werder Bremen. After being selected by the coach of the reserve team, Alexander Nouri, to join the squad, he made his 3. Liga debut on 12 March 2016 in a 1–0 loss against Rot-Weiß Erfurt coming as a substitute for Enis Bytyqi in the 67th minute.

References

External links
 

1997 births
German people of Turkish descent
Footballers from Bremen
Living people
German footballers
Turkish footballers
Turkey youth international footballers
Association football forwards
SV Werder Bremen II players
BSV Schwarz-Weiß Rehden players
FC Oberneuland players
SSV Jeddeloh players
3. Liga players
Regionalliga players
Oberliga (football) players